MS Starward was a cruise ship built in 1968 at the AG Weser shipyard in Bremerhaven, West Germany. Originally commissioned for Norwegian Caribbean Line after the success of its first ship, Starward was the first purpose-built ship for the newly-established cruise line. In 1995, Starward was sold to Festival Cruises, which they renamed the vessel Bolero. The vessel was shortly chartered to Spanish Cruise Line, however, it was sold to Abou Merhi Cruises after Festival Cruises was forced to declare bankruptcy in early 2004. In 2006, Louis Cruise Lines bought Orient Queen and kept the name intact. Orient Queen was briefly used the United States Government in 2006 to evacuate U.S. citizens out of Lebanon due to conflict between Lebanon and Israel. Louis Cruise Lines renamed the ship to Louis Aura in 2012. In 2017, Etstur, a Turkish travel agency, chartered the ship and renamed it to Aegean Queen. She was sold to for scrap the following year, and was broken up in Alang, India.

History 
Built at the AG Weser shipyard in Bremerhaven, West Germany, Starward would also have a roll-on/roll-off freight capacity to transport vehicles. During construction, however, the demand for cruises on Sunward greatly exceeded, which prompted Kloster to request Wandborg to change the design and exclude the freight capacity for cabins instead. On 21 December 1968, Starward sailed on its first cruise out of Miami, Florida, United States. Starward was the first Norwegian-flagged ship to meet American ‘Method 1’ fire-protection standards that specified the use of non-combustible materials throughout passenger and crew accommodations.

In 1995, Greek line Festival Cruises announced that Starward would be delivered to them from Norwegian Cruise Line in October of the same year, renaming the vessel to Bolero. In 2001, Festival Cruises chartered the ship to Spanish Cruise Line. Following the collapse of Festival Cruises, Bolero was bought by Cruises Elysia in 2004 who sold her on to Abou Merhi Cruises as Orient Queen. She was refitted the following year at a cost of $9.5 million, with the addition of a helicopter pad that was added and managed by Österreichischer Lloyd Ship Management. Orient Queen operated from Beirut for six months with seven-day cruises to Cyprus, Egypt, Greece, and Turkey. In November 2005, the ship was re-positioned in Dubai to begin what was an unsuccessful Persian Gulf cruise program, providing the first luxury cruise line service between Dubai and Gulf Cooperation Council countries. The ship was then positioned in Beirut and scheduled to begin a 2006 cruise season in the Mediterranean Sea.

In July 2006, Orient Queen was used to help evacuate United States citizens from Lebanon because of the ongoing conflict with Israel. It took the evacuees to the port of Larnaca in Cyprus.

In August 2006, Orient Queen was sold to Louis Cruise Lines of Cyprus and operated cruises under the same name. In 2013, Louis Cruise Lines renamed Orient Queen as Louis Aura, which sailed to the Greek Isles from Limassol, Cyprus and Piraeus, Greece. Under the flag of Malta, the ship was owned and operated by the Cyprus-based company Louis Cruises. For the summer season of 2014, the ship executed 3/4/5/6 & 7-day cruises to the Greek Isles departing from Limassol, Cyprus.

In 2017, the Turkish travel agency Etstur chartered the ship. At the end of May 2017, the ship was renamed Aegean Queen after more than a year's layover and returned to service in July 2017. In October 2017, the ship was again out of service near Piraeus. With her 49 years of service, she was one of the longest-serving cruise ships in the world.

In 2018, she was sold for scrap, and was broken up at Alang, India on 17 July 2018.

References

External links

Shipspotting.com

1968 ships
Ships built in Bremen (state)
Ships of Norwegian Cruise Line
Ships of Celestyal Cruises